Walt Harrington''' (born September 2, 1950) is an American Journalist, author, and educator. Harrington is a former staff writer for the Washington Post Magazine, where he wrote benchmark profiles for Jesse Jackson, Jerry Falwell, Bryan Stevenson, Rosa Parks and George H. W. Bush, as well as numerous in-depth stories on the lives of ordinary people. He graduated from Blackburn College with a B.A., and the University of Missouri with Masters degrees in Journalism and Sociology. Harrington has been the author or editor of eleven books. His book The Everlasting Stream: A True Story of Rabbits, Guns, Friendship, and Family was adapted into an Emmy-winning PBS Documentary. In 2016 Harrington became a professor emeritus at the University of Illinois, where for 20 years he taught literary journalism and served as head of the Department of Journalism and as an associate chancellor. He is the father of two and lives with his wife of many years Keran Elliott Harrington in Illinois.

BibliographyAmerican Profiles: Somebodies and Nobodies Who Matter, (Missouri: University of Missouri, 1992)Crossings: A White Man's Journey into Black America, (New York: HarperCollins, 1993)Intimate Journalism: The Art and Craft of Reporting Everyday Life, (New York: SAGE Publications, Inc, 1994)At the Heart of It: Ordinary People, Extraordinary Lives, (Missouri: University of Missouri, 1996)The Everlasting Stream: A True Story of Rabbits, Guns, Friendship, and Family, (New York: Grove Press, 2004)The Beholder's Eye: A Collection of America's Finest Personal Journalism, Edited by Walt Harrington (New York: Grove Press, 2005)Next Wave: America's New Generation of Great Literary Journalists, as Editor (San Diego, CA: CreateSpace,2012)Slices of Life, edited by Walt Harrington, (Champaign, Illinois: The News-Gazette, 2013)
 Acts of Creation: America's Finest Hand Craftsmen at Work(San Diego, CA: The Sager Group, 2014)
 Artful Journalism: Essays in the Craft and Magic of True Storytelling, (San Diego, CA: The Sager Group, 2015)
 The Detective: And Other True Stories'', (San Diego, CA: The Sager Group, NeoText, 2021)

References

External links 
 Profile at University of Illinois

1950 births
Living people
People from Will County, Illinois
Emory University alumni
Writers from Illinois
University of Illinois Urbana-Champaign faculty
University of Missouri alumni
American male journalists
American columnists
American magazine writers
American newspaper writers
American investigative journalists
The Washington Post journalists